Takifugu xanthopterus is a species of fish in the family Tetraodontidae. It is found in Hong Kong, Japan, and Taiwan.

References

Sources

xanthopterus
Fish described in 1850
Taxonomy articles created by Polbot